The Sans Arc, or Itázipčho (Itazipcola, Hazipco - ‘Those who hunt without bows’) in Lakota, are a subdivision of the Lakota people.  Sans Arc is the French translation of the Lakota name which means, "Without bows."  The translator of Wooden Leg: A Warrior Who Fought Custer renders the name as Arrows all Gone.  They live in the Cheyenne River Reservation.

One of the many etymologies of the Lakota name tells the following story:  The true meaning of Itazipacola is "no markings".  This referred to the fact that the Itazipco were so generous they did not mark their arrows (they were usually marked so that braves could claim the bison they killed, etc.), that way everyone could share the meat of the hunt.  This is why when the Creator wanted to give the pipe to the Lakota, the White Buffalo Woman Wopi brought it to the Itazipco, because they would always be willing to share it.

Historic Itázipčho thiyóšpaye or bands 
Together with the Minneconjou (Mnikȟówožu, Hokwoju - ‘Plants by the Water’) and Two Kettles (Oóhe Núŋpa, Oóhenuŋpa, Oohenonpa - ‘Two Boiling’ or ‘Two Kettles’) they were often referred to as Central Lakota and divided into several bands or thiyóšpaye:

 Itazipco-hca (‘Real Itazipco’)
 Mini sala (‘Red Water’)
 Sina luta oin or Shinalutaoin (‘Red Cloth Earring’)
 Woluta yuta (‘Eat dried venison from the hindquarter’, ‘Ham Eaters’)
 Maz pegnaka (‘Wear Metal Hair Ornament’)
 Tatanka Cesli or Tatankachesli (‘Dung of a buffalo bull’)
 Siksicela or Shikshichela (‘Bad Ones’, ‘Bad ones of different kinds’)
 Tiyopa Canupa or Tiyopaoshanunpa (‘Smokes at the Entrance’)

Famous Sans Arcs 

 Spotted Eagle 
 Red Bear
 Looks Up
 Circling Bear
 Elk Head
 Black Hawk
 Hump Nose, a chief present at the Custer fight.

References

 Lakota Page, The Great Sioux Nation
Thomas B. Marquis (interpreter), Wooden Leg: a warrior who fought Custer, p. 180, University of Nebraska Press, 2003 .